The 2012 Champion Stakes was the 136th running of the Champion Stakes horse race. It was run over one mile and two furlongs at Ascot Racecourse on 20 October 2012.

Race details
 Sponsor: QIPCO
 Winner's prize money: £737,230
 Going: Soft
 Number of runners: 6
 Winner's time: 2 minutes, 10.22 seconds

Full result

* The distances between the horses are shown in lengths

Winner details
Further details of the winner, Frankel:

 Foaled: 11 February 2008, in Great Britain
 Sire: Galileo; Dam: Kind (Danehill)
 Owner: Khalid Abdulla
 Breeder: Juddmonte Farms

Form analysis

Previous Group 1 wins
Group 1 victories prior to running in the 2012 Champion Stakes:

 Frankel – Dewhurst Stakes (2010), 2000 Guineas Stakes (2011), St James's Palace Stakes (2011), Sussex Stakes (2011, 2012), Queen Elizabeth II Stakes (2011), Lockinge Stakes (2012), Queen Anne Stakes (2012), International Stakes (2012)
 Cirrus des Aigles – Champion Stakes (2011), Dubai Sheema Classic (2012), Prix Ganay (2012)
 Nathaniel – King George VI and Queen Elizabeth Stakes (2011), Eclipse Stakes (2012)
 Pastorius – Deutsches Derby (2012), Bayerisches Zuchtrennen (2012)
 Master of Hounds – Jebel Hatta (2012)

Subsequent Group 1 wins
Group 1 victories after running in the Champion Stakes:

 Pastorius – Prix Ganay (2013)
 Cirrus des Aigles – Prix Ganay (2014, 2015), Prix d'Ispahan (2014), Coronation Cup (2014)

References

2012 in British sport
2012 in English sport
2012 in horse racing
2010s in Berkshire
October 2012 sports events in the United Kingdom